Ludlow Hospital is an NHS community hospital located on Gravel Hill in Ludlow, Shropshire, England. It is managed by the Shropshire Community Health NHS Trust.

History
The facility has its origins in the Ludlow Poor Law Workhouse which was established in 1833. The facility was converted into a hospital and joined the National Health Service as Ludlow Hamlet Hospital in 1948. It became Ludlow Hospital in 1982.
 
After plans for a new hospital for Ludlow were dropped in 2013, the existing hospital was renovated in 2014. Local campaigners have been fearful that the hospital - and particularly inpatient provision - is under threat.  Bed numbers have been officially reduced from 40 to 24.

References

External links
NHS Choices Ludlow Community Hospital
Shropshire Community Health NHS Trust Ludlow
 

Hospitals in Shropshire
NHS hospitals in England
Buildings and structures in Ludlow